Ruth Schleiermacher (later Ruth Budzisch-Schleiermacher, born 3 November 1949) is a former East German speedskater. She took part in eight international championships. Twice at the European Championships (1971 and 1972), thrice at the World Allround Championships (1967, 1968 and 1969), once at the World Sprint Championships (1971) and two times at the Winter Olympics, 1968 and 1972.

Career
Schleiermacher was born in Wunsiedel, Bavaria.  At her international debut during the Wch Allround of 1967 in Deventer she finished 27th. A year later, during the op het Wch Allround of 1968, she had improved to become 16th. Progress was such that the next year this had become the 4th place overall, while she won a silver distance medal on the 500m. 
After a year of absence at the big tournaments (though she did become East-German Champion that year), she returned next year, better than ever before. At the World Sprint Championships of 1971 in Inzell Schleiermacher wins her first and only international title, becoming the successor of Lyudmila Titova from the Soviet Union.

World records
Over the course of her career, Schleiermacher  skated one official world record:

Note that her best score on the sprint combination was skated before there was an official world record for that event. It was a world best performance at that time though.

Personal records

To put these personal records in perspective, the column WR lists the official world records on the dates that Schleiermacher skated her personal records.

References
Notes

Bibliography

 Budzisch, Margot with Klaus Huhn, Lothar Skorning and Günther Wonneberger. Chronik des DDR-Sports (in German). Berlin, Germany: Spotless-Verlag, 2000.
 Eng, Trond and Marnix Koolhaas. National All Time & Encyclopedia Men/Ladies as at 1.7.1985, Issue No. 3: "German Democratic Republic" (bilingual Norwegian/English). Degernes, Norway: WSSSA-Skøytenytt, 1985.
 Huhn, Klaus. Die DDR bei Olympia, 1956-1988 (in German). Berlin, Germany: Spotless-Verlag, 2001. .
 Kluge, Volker. Das große Lexikon der DDR-Sportler: Die 1000 erfolgreichsten und populärsten Sportlerinnen und Sportler aus der DDR, ihre Erfolge und Biographien (in German). Berlin, Germany: Schwarzkopf & Schwarzkopf, 2004. .
 Zickow, Alfred. 100 Jahre Deutsche Eisschnellauf Meisterschaften, 1891-1991. Ein Beitrag zur Geschichte des Eisschnellaufes (in German). Berlin, Germany: DESG, 1991.

External links
 Ruth Schleiermacher at SpeedSkatingStats.com
 Statistiek bij Speedskatingnews
 www.sports-reference.com

1949 births
German female speed skaters
Speed skaters at the 1968 Winter Olympics
Speed skaters at the 1972 Winter Olympics
Olympic speed skaters of East Germany
World record setters in speed skating
Living people
Sportspeople from Upper Franconia
People from Wunsiedel